Zach Jacobson (born December 12, 1984, in Langdon, North Dakota, United States) is an American curler.

Teams

Private life
Zach Jacobson resides in Langdon, North Dakota.

He graduated North Dakota State University.

His father is a curler Joel Jacobson. Zach's brother Zane is also a curler.

References

External links

Living people
1984 births
People from Cavalier County, North Dakota
Sportspeople from North Dakota
American male curlers
North Dakota State University alumni